The Lindenberg Nijmegen Culture House, founded in 1972, was a project opened by the Netherlands Minister of Culture, Piet Engels. It is a cultural house (theatre) in Nijmegen, Netherlands, on the Ridderstraat next to the Valkhof Museum. The Lindenberg operates theatre programs, hosts performances, hosts education courses, and has a cafe. The organization also receives a subsidy from the government.

History
The Minister of Culture, Piet Engels opened the institution in 1972. Initially there were free academies, a music school and a public library. In the year 2000, the Lindenberg was suffering financially. The organization began to generate profits by raising prices for their clients, and eliminating some activities.

The Lindenberg is now one of 30 Nijmegen cultural organizations to be awarded a government subsidy. The Lindenberg also hosts exhibitions which commemorate the history of Nijmegen.

In 2018, Teddy Vrijmoet became the director of the theatre. She replaced Ilse Verburgh, who left in 2017.

Courses
The Lindenberg also offers courses for students. Some courses include DJing, urban dance and comedy. The Lindenberg also offers individual music lessons for music students.

Valkhof Hall
Lindenberg has a large hall which can accommodate up to 1,200 people. The hall is host to lectures, weddings, meetings and workshops.

See also
Culture House Eemhuis
Hollandsche Schouwburg
Royal Theater Carré
Flint (theatre)

References

External links
Lindenberg Nijmegen

Buildings and structures in Nijmegen
Theatres in the Netherlands